João Pedro de Moura Siembarski (born 8 February 2002), known as João Pedro, is a Brazilian footballer who plays as a midfielder for Athletico Paranaense.

Club career
Born in São Miguel Arcanjo, São Paulo, João Pedro was an Athletico Paranaense youth graduate. He made his first team debut on 1 September 2021, coming on as a second-half substitute for Fernando Canesin in a 1–1 Campeonato Paranaense home draw against FC Cascavel.

Career statistics

Honours
Athletico Paranaense
 Copa Sudamericana: 2021

References

External links
Athletico Paranaense profile 

2002 births
Living people
Footballers from São Paulo (state)
Brazilian footballers
Association football midfielders
Campeonato Paranaense players
Club Athletico Paranaense players